Deanne Panday (born 10 December 1968) is an Indian wellness coach and author.

Books and DVDs
 I'm Not Stressed 
 Shut Up and Train!
 Bipasha Basu fitness DVD Unleash, in collaboration with Deanne Pandey
 Majet Jaga: Tanavmukt Jaganyasathi (I'm Not Stressed in Marathi)
 Balance.

References

External links
 

Women writers from Maharashtra
Writers from Mumbai
Living people
1968 births
Indian sportswriters
Indian people of Scottish descent